Jonas de Gélieu (21 August 1740, in Les Bayards – 17 October 1827, in Colombier) was a Swiss pastor and beekeeper, notable for his contact with Jean Jacques Rousseau and Isabelle de Charrière.

Archive Sources

External links
Marcel S. Jacquat: Gélieu, Jonas de in Historischen Lexikon der Schweiz

1740 births
1827 deaths
Swiss beekeepers
18th-century Calvinist and Reformed ministers
19th-century Calvinist and Reformed ministers
Swiss Calvinist and Reformed ministers
People from Val-de-Travers District